Homer Winston Thompson (January 18, 1916 – June 19, 2007) was an American professional basketball player. He played for the Indianapolis Kautskys and Sheboygan Red Skins in the National Basketball League, as well as the Louisville Colonels in the Professional Basketball League of America.

Thompson played college basketball at the University of Kentucky (where he also boxed). His professional career was interrupted by serving in World War II. Thompson spent his post-basketball career as a teacher in Jeffersonville, Indiana, before moving to Fort Lauderdale, Florida, in 1958. He then worked for Broward County Board of Health. Thompson returned to Indiana in 2003 before dying several years later.

References

1916 births
2007 deaths
American men's basketball players
Basketball players from Indiana
Centers (basketball)
Forwards (basketball)
Indianapolis Kautskys players
Kentucky Wildcats men's basketball players
People from Jeffersonville, Indiana
Professional Basketball League of America players
Sheboygan Red Skins players
United States Marine Corps personnel of World War II